Sitka is an unincorporated community in Clark County, Kansas, United States.

History
Sitka was founded in 1909.

Its post office was closed on May 22, 1964.  The Atchison, Topeka and Santa Fe depot, built in 1930, has been moved to Dodge City and is now part of the Boot Hill Museum.

The town today consists of only three occupied houses, a grain elevator, a few vacant buildings, and numerous ruins. Most of the town is on private property.

Education
The community is served by Ashland USD 220 public school district.

References

Further reading

External links
 Clark County maps: Current, Historic, KDOT

Unincorporated communities in Clark County, Kansas
Unincorporated communities in Kansas